Saint-Denis-en-Bugey (literally Saint-Denis in Bugey) is a commune in the Ain department in eastern France.

Geography
The town lies on the left bank of the river Albarine, which forms all of the commune's northern border.

Population

See also
Communes of the Ain department

References

Communes of Ain
Ain communes articles needing translation from French Wikipedia